António da Cruz Pinto Saraiva (3 May 1934 – 7 May 2018), simply known as Saraiva, was a Portuguese footballer who played as a defender, either in the center or in the right.

Career
Born in Peso da Régua, Saraiva started playing in his hometown club, Sport Club Régua, before moving to S.C. Salgueiros. In 1956, he joined Caldas Sport Clube, drawing the attention of S.L. Benfica, that acquire him in 1959, after Caldas was relegated.

Making his debut on 22 November 1959 at hands of Béla Guttmann, over the course of four seasons, he makes 29 league appearances with one goal. He played his last match for Benfica on 24 March 1963, with Fernando Riera.

Honours
Benfica
European Cup; 1960-61, Runner-up 1961-62
Portuguese League: 1959–60, 1960–61,  1962–63
Portuguese Cup: 1961-62

References

External links

1934 births
2018 deaths
People from Peso da Régua
Portuguese footballers
Association football defenders
Primeira Liga players
S.C. Salgueiros players
Caldas S.C. players
S.L. Benfica footballers
Sportspeople from Vila Real District